Brigadier-General Mosby Monroe Parsons (May 21, 1822 – August 15, 1865) was a senior officer of the Confederate States Army who commanded infantry in the Trans-Mississippi Theater of the American Civil War. Parsons was murdered by Captain Dario Garza, at the head of a body of Mexican soldiers, on or about August 15, 1865, near China, Nuevo León, Mexico.

Early life and career 
The eldest child of Gustavus Adolphus Parsons and his wife Patience Monroe Bishop, Mosby Monroe Parsons was born in Charlottesville, Virginia. When he was 13, his parents moved to Cole County, Missouri. Two years later, they moved again to Jefferson City, which Parsons would thereafter make his home. As a young man, Mosby read law and was admitted to the bar in 1846. He served as a volunteer in the Mexican–American War with the rank of captain in Colonel Alexander W. Doniphan's regiment and was cited for gallantry at the Battle of Sacramento on February 28, 1847.

Returning to Missouri after the war, Parsons married Mary Wells on September 18, 1850. However, his wife died just three years later, leaving him with an infant son, Stephen Kearney Parsons. Parsons served as the United States District Attorney for western Missouri. In 1856, he was elected to the state legislature.  He became a Missouri state senator in 1858, serving until the American Civil War.

American Civil War 
Parsons was appointed brigadier general in command of the Sixth Division of the Missouri State Guard. He arrived too late to participate in the skirmish at Boonville, but he went on to lead his division at Carthage and the Battle of Wilson's Creek in Missouri. Although his Missouri State Guardsmen participated in the Battle of Pea Ridge in Arkansas, Parsons was absent from this action seeking an appointment in the Confederate States Army in Richmond, Virginia.

Parsons was commissioned a brigadier general of the Confederacy on November 5, 1862, and led his infantry brigade in the Battle of Prairie Grove, Arkansas, one month later. His force would participate in the attack at Helena, Arkansas on July 4, 1863, and assisted Richard Taylor in thwarting Union Major General Nathaniel Banks' Red River Campaign of 1864 in Louisiana (Battle of Pleasant Hill), as well as opposing Union Major General Frederick Steele's Camden Expedition in Arkansas, including participation at the Battle of Jenkins' Ferry. Parsons was appointed a major general by Trans-Mississippi Departmental Commander Kirby Smith on April 30, 1864, although his promotion was never confirmed by Jefferson Davis.

Murder in Mexico 
After the war's end, Parsons, like many other Missouri Confederates, chose to go to Mexico rather than return to Missouri. Parsons and three companions, including his brother-in-law, Capt. Austin M. Standish, Standish's orderly William "Dutch Bill" Wenderling and former Confederate Congressman Aaron H. Conrow were murdered by Captain Dario Garza, at the head of a body of Mexican soldiers, on or about August 15, 1865, near China, Nuevo León, as they were headed for Camargo Municipality, Tamaulipas. The bodies of Parsons and his comrades were buried in unmarked graves where they were killed.

In 1868, Parsons' son (Kearny Parsons) and sister (Mildred Standish), along with the family of Aaron Conrow, sued the Mexican government via the U.S. and Mexico Claims Commission Convention. In 1875, a judgment in the amount of almost US$50,000.00 in gold was awarded to each of the plaintiffs.

Honors
Camp No. 718 of the Sons of Confederate Veterans in Jefferson City, Missouri, is named after him.

See also 
 List of Confederate generals
 List of people from Virginia

References

Further reading

 Eicher, John H., and David J. Eicher, Civil War High Commands. Stanford: Stanford University Press, 2001. .
 Gurley, Bill J. "Mosby Monroe Parsons: Missouri's Forgotten Brigadier" in "Confederate Generals in the Trans-Mississippi, Volume 1." Knoxville, Tennessee, University of Tennessee Press, 2013. .
 Gurley, Bill J. "Mosby Monroe Parsons: Major General, Murder Victim" in "Confederate Generals in the Trans-Mississippi, Volume 2." Knoxville, Tennessee, University of Tennessee Press, 2015. .
 Hinze, David; Farnham, Karen, The Battle of Carthage, Border War in Southwest Missouri, July 5, 1861.  Gretna, Louisiana:  Pelican Publishing, 2004.  .
 Sifakis, Stewart. Who Was Who in the Civil War. New York: Facts On File, 1988. .
 Warner, Ezra J. Generals in Gray: Lives of the Confederate Commanders. Baton Rouge: Louisiana State University Press, 1959. .

External links 

Official
 Mosby Monroe Parsons Papers at the Missouri Historical Society
Other
 Brig. Gen. Mosby Monroe Parsons Camp No. 718 of the Sons of Confederate Veterans
 
 
 

1822 births
1860s missing person cases
1865 deaths
19th-century American lawyers
19th-century American politicians
American lawyers admitted to the practice of law by reading law
American exiles
American expatriates in Mexico
American military personnel of the Mexican–American War
American refugees
Burials in Nuevo León
Confederate expatriates
Confederate States Army brigadier generals
Deaths by firearm in Mexico
Democratic Party members of the Missouri House of Representatives
Missouri lawyers
Missouri State Guard
Democratic Party Missouri state senators
People declared dead in absentia
People from Charlottesville, Virginia
People of Missouri in the American Civil War
People murdered in Mexico
Refugees in Mexico
Stateless people
United States Attorneys for the Western District of Missouri